Jon Gomm  (born 11 July 1977) is an English singer-songwriter and performer. Using a single acoustic guitar to create drum sounds, bass lines and melodies simultaneously, his songs draw on a range of influences and styles including blues, soul, rock and even metal.  Michael Hedges is an important source of inspiration. To date he has recorded three solo albums and has toured full-time since 2004.

Biography
Jon Gomm started playing ukulele at the age of two. Classical guitar lessons began at the age of four, and at twelve, he was accompanying his father, a music critic, to blues gigs in his hometown of Blackpool. As a teenager, he played electric guitar in the style of the rock greats.

On leaving school, Gomm turned down a place at Oxford University studying English to attend The Guitar Institute (now part of the Institute of Contemporary Music Performance) in London. While there, he paid his way through college playing jazz in café bars, recording as a session guitarist, and playing Country music in Working men's clubs for line dancers. He moved to the Yorkshire city of Leeds, where he is now based, to study in the Jazz degree course at Leeds College of Music.

His solo performances started in Leeds. He extended the sounds he could make with an acoustic guitar – hitting the surface to make snare drum, bass drum and bongo sounds, re-tuning the strings to get bass sounds, and using high harmonics from the guitar for synthesizer-like effects. He worked these techniques into his own songs and put his years of singing blues into use.

Musically he is a disciple of Michael Hedges and as such part of a generation of guitarists using extended techniques which includes Andy McKee and Erik Mongrain. The tattoo on his arm is from the cover of the Michael Hedges album Oracle.

Jon Gomm has rejected mainstream music industry values and practices and avoids playing chain venues and corporate festivals. His appearances are generally organised with independent promoters in venues like real ale pubs in rural areas, theatres or arts centre. He has been a regular performer at The Junction Inn, Otley for many years and attracts a large crowd whenever in town.

In addition to his own performances, he has also played gigs with Tommy Emmanuel (Australia), Nick Harper and Bob Brozman.

He has performed at festivals including Download, Electric Picnic, The Canadian Guitar Festival, The Italian National Guitar Festival, The Garforth Arts Festival and The London Guitar Show at Wembley Arena. He performs regularly across the UK and the rest of the world with tours in China, Brazil, South Africa, Turkey, Australia and Canada.

In February 2012, a video of him performing his song "Passionflower" was the subject of a tweet from the broadcaster Stephen Fry. This led to him appearing on several television shows and being booked for gigs and tours around the world during 2012, as well as releasing an instrumental cover of Chaka Khan's classic "Ain't Nobody.”

In November 2013, the album Secrets Nobody Keeps was released after being 100% crowd funded in four weeks in a PledgeMusic campaign.  The album title is a nod to Gomm's gratitude for the power of social networks and a reference to the Stephen Fry tweet mentioned above. "The success of the PledgeMusic campaign has been so gratifying," enthuses Gomm "People tell me I'm too open on social networks, but I lived through all these overwhelming life-changes online, taking support from my friends and fans.”

On 12 August 2020, Gomm released "Cocoon”,  his first single in seven years, from his new album The Faintest Idea.

Discography

Hypertension
Jon Gomm's first album, Hypertension, was released on his own label in 2003. All tracks are single takes, with no overdubs.

All songs written by Jon Gomm unless otherwise stated.

 "Waiting in Vain" (Bob Marley) (Chis Korpos)
 "Clockwork"
 "H"
 "Stupid Blues"
 "Less To You"
 "Hey Child"
 "High and Dry" (Radiohead)
 "Swallow You Whole"
 "Butterfly Hurricane"
 "Happy Room"
 "Crazy Jonny"
 "Waterfall"

Don't Panic
 "Waterfall"
 "Afterglow"
 "Temporary"
 "Gloria"
 "Topeka"
 "Loveproof"
 "Surrender"
 "Rescue Song"
 "The Weather Machine"
 "Wake Up!"
 "What's Left For You?"

Secrets Nobody Keeps
All songs written by Jon Gomm unless otherwise stated.
 "Telepathy" 
 "Ain't Nobody" (Hawk Wolinski)
 "There's No Need To Be Afraid"
 "Wukan Motorcycle Kid"
 "Deep Cut"
 "Orville (The Secret of Learning To Fly Is Forgetting To Hit The Ground)"
 "Passionflower"
 "Message in a Bottle" (Sting)
 "Dance of the Last Rhino"
 "Everything"

The Faintest Idea
"Deep Sea Fishes"
"Cocoon"
"Dream Factories"
"Tempest"
"The Ghost Inside You"
"Universal Biology"
"Song for a Rainy Day"
"Check You're Still Breathing"
"Butterfly Hurricane"
"Swallow You Whole"
"Until the Sun Destroys the Earth"

Singles
In 2011, Gomm released three self-produced singles through his website.

 "Passionflower"
 "Message in a Bottle" (Originally by The Police)
 "Ain't Nobody" (Originally by Chaka Khan)
 "Cocoon"

Videography
 Ain't Nobody (Chaka Khan cover) featuring Daniel Tompkins (2013)
 Ain't Nobody (Chaka Khan cover) (2012)
 Message in a Bottle (The Police cover) (2011)
 Passionflower (2011)

Press
Acoustic guitar player and singer-songwriter, Jon Gomm, was catapulted into the spotlight with a single one word tweet: “wow”. The tweet, sent in February 2012 by comedian, director, writer, actor Stephen Fry

"...how on earth can one man play so proficiently a "one man
band" style that puts full bands to shame?" Sandman Magazine.

"Leeds should feel very lucky to have such a performer to call its own" Leedsmusicscene.net.

"We have seen the future of acoustic guitar playing, and it is called Jon Gomm" Blues Matters!.

References

External links
 
 Jon Gomm page on Last.fm
 Official Jon Gomm page on MySpace

Living people
Acoustic guitarists
English blues guitarists
English male guitarists
English blues singers
Alumni of Leeds College of Music
People from Blackpool
1977 births
Musicians from Leeds